Chinese boy band and the fourth overall sub-unit of the South Korean boy band NCT, WayV, has released one studio albums, one reissue, three extended plays (EP), one single album, and nine singles with SM Entertainment's Chinese sub-label, Label V. WayV debuted in 2019 with the single album The Vision, with a Chinese version of NCT 127's "Regular" as the lead single. In the same year, the group entered the Billboard World Albums chart for the first time with their first EP, Take Off. Their second EP, Take Over the Moon, was released on October 29, 2019, and debuted in the South Korean Gaon Album Chart and Billboard Heatseekers Albums chart. In 2020, WayV's first studio album, Awaken the World, managed to enter the top ten on both Gaon and Billboard World Albums chart as well as became the group's first entry on the Japanese Oricon and Billboard Japan charts. In 2021, WayV managed to top the Gaon Album Chart for the first time with their third EP, Kick Back, which also earned the group their first certification for selling more than 250,000 copies in South Korea.

Beside unit releases, WayV also released songs as part of NCT's albums, such as  "月之迷 (Nectar)" (for NCT 2020 Resonance) and "Miracle" (for Universe).

Albums

Studio albums

Reissues

Single albums

Extended plays

Singles

Soundtrack appearances

Other charted songs

Notes

References

Discography
Discographies of Chinese artists
Pop music group discographies